The 12409 / 12410 Raigarh–Hazrat Nizamuddin Gondwana Express is a Superfast Express train belonging to Indian Railways that runs between Raigarh and  in India. It is a 5-day service. It operates as train number 12409 from Raigarh to Hazrat Nizamuddin and as train number 12410 in the reverse direction.>

Coaches

The 12409/12410 Raigarh–Hazrat Nizamuddin Gondwana Express presently has 1 AC 2 tier, 2 AC 3 tier, 13 Sleeper class & 5 General Unreserved coaches.

As with most train services in India, coach composition may be amended at the discretion of Indian Railways depending on demand.

Service

The 12409 Raigarh–Hazrat Nizamuddin Gondwana Express covers the distance of 1626 kilometers in 27 hours and 55 mins (58.24 km/hr) & 27 hours 40 mins as 12410 Nizamuddin–Raigarh Gondwana Express (58.77 km/hr).

As its average speed in both directions is above 55 km/hr as per Indian Railways rules, its fare has a Superfast surcharge.  In addition, it gets priority over local (commuter) trains, standard express, passenger trains and most freight trains.

Traction

Its longest halt is at Nagpur with 40 minutes, where it reverses the direction. It is hauled by a Bhusaval-based WAP-4 locomotive from RIG to NGP. From NGP to NZM it is hauled by a Tughlakabad- based WAP-7 locomotive and vice versa.

Route & Halts

 Raigarh
 Kharsia
 Champa
 Akaltara
 Bilaspur Junction
 Bhatapara
 Tilda Newra
 Raipur Junction
 Durg Junction
 
 Dongargarh
 Gondia Junction
 
 Nagpur Junction
 Amla Junction
 Itarsi Junction
 Hoshangabad
 Bhopal Junction
 
 
 Virangana Lakshmibai Junction
 Agra Cantonment
 Mathura Junction

Rake sharing
The train shares its rake with 12405/12406 Bhusaval–Hazrat Nizamuddin Gondwana Express.

Incidents and accidents

Bombs on the train
In January 2015, a bag containing eight crude bombs was discovered in Gondwana Express, after a train ticket checker noticed it around 3PM. The train was halted at Sihora Road Station, the low intensity bombs were defused, after which the journey was resumed. Later, a 40 year old engineer Vineet Kumar from Bihar was held for planting these bombs.

Train running status 
Gondwana Express has a history of being delayed regularly by a few hours. However, once the train was delayed by 17 hours during a fog that hit Bhopal in December 2016.

See also 
Indian Railways

References

Transport in Delhi
Rail transport in Chhattisgarh
Rail transport in Maharashtra
Rail transport in Madhya Pradesh
Rail transport in Delhi
Express trains in India
Named passenger trains of India